Iron Man 3 (Original Motion Picture Soundtrack) is the film score for the Marvel Studios film, Iron Man 3 by Brian Tyler, released on April 30, 2013. A separate soundtrack and concept album titled, Iron Man 3: Heroes Fall (Music Inspired by the Motion Picture) by various artists was released on the same date by Hollywood Records and Marvel Music.

Iron Man 3 (Original Motion Picture Soundtrack)

Composer Brian Tyler acknowledged that the film's score needed to be darker and more melodic than Ramin Djawadi and John Debney's previous scores, citing the change in Tony Stark's life following the events of The Avengers as the catalyst.

The score was recorded at Abbey Road Studios by the London Philharmonic Orchestra.

Track listing 
All music is composed by Brian Tyler.

Iron Man 3: Heroes Fall (Music Inspired by the Motion Picture)

Track listing

Charts

Additional music
Music not included in the Iron Man 3 soundtrack, but featured in the film:

References

2013 soundtrack albums
2010s film soundtrack albums
Hollywood Records compilation albums
Iron Man (film series)
Marvel Cinematic Universe: Phase Two soundtracks
Marvel Music compilation albums
Brian Tyler soundtracks